1990 is a year.

1990 may also refer to:
 1990 (number), the natural number following 1989 and preceding 1991
 1990 (TV series), a 1977-78 BBC2 dystopian political thriller series
 1990 (The Temptations album), 1973
 1990 (Daniel Johnston album)
 "1990", a song by Jean Leloup
 MCMXC a.D., a 1990 album by Enigma